Mario Miltone (born August 26, 1906 in Novara) was an Italian professional football player.

1906 births
Year of death missing
Italian footballers
Serie A players
Novara F.C. players
U.S. Lecce players
Inter Milan players
A.C.R. Messina players
Catania S.S.D. players
U.S. Catanzaro 1929 players
Association football defenders